The Germanic (or "German") Heroic Age, so called in analogy to the Heroic Age of Greek mythology, is the period of early historic or quasi-historic events reflected in Germanic heroic poetry.

Periodisation 
The period corresponds to the Germanic Wars in terms of historiography, and to the Germanic Iron Age in terms of archaeology, spanning the early centuries of the 1st millennium, in particular the 4th and 5th centuries, the period of the final collapse of the Western Roman Empire and the establishment of stable "barbarian kingdoms" larger than at the tribal level (the kingdoms of the Visigoths and Ostrogoths, the Franks and the Burgundians, and the Anglo-Saxon settlement of Britain). The Germanic peoples at the time lived mostly in tribal societies.

William Paton Ker in Epic and Romance (1897)  takes the "heroic age" as predating the "age of chivalry" with its new literary genre of Romance. Ker would thus extend the Germanic heroic age to the point of Christianization, to the inclusion of the Scandinavian Viking Age and culminating in the Icelandic family sagas of the 13th century.
Indeed, Christianization resulted in the loss of the tradition of heroic poetry, although there are examples of heroic poems that postdate Christianization by several centuries, such as The Battle of Maldon, composed three centuries after the Christianization of the Anglo-Saxons, or the Hildebrandslied, written at Fulda 300 years after the Christianization of the Franks. The Prose Edda itself originated as a handbook for skaldic poets, compiled by Snorri Sturluson more than 200 years after the Christianisation of Iceland, because poetic tradition at that time was threatened by extinction.

Historicity
Germanic mythology combines purely mythological material with historical events of this period.

Identifiable historical characters appearing in Germanic heroic poetry, notably in the Völsung and Tyrfing cycles, include:
 Gundaharius, king of the Burgundians, as Gunnar/Gunther
 Theodoric the Great (454–526) in the Þiðrekssaga as well as in Middle High German legends about Dietrich von Bern
 Attila the Hun (406–453) in the Atlakviða
 the Roman Emperors as Kjárr

A number of tribal kings of the 5th to 6th centuries reflected in heroic poetry are likely historical, but only rarely can this be established from independent historiographic tradition, as in the case of Hygelac, king of the Geats who appears both in the heroic poem Beowulf and in historiographic sources such as the Liber Historiae Francorum.

See also
 Germanic poetry
 Heroic poetry
 Heldenbuch
 Migration period
 The Battle of the Goths and Huns
 Widsith
 Christianization of the Germanic peoples
 Germanic paganism
 Mythical kings of Sweden
 List of legendary kings of Denmark

References

 
Heroic Age
Migration Period